Terebino is a rural locality (a village) and the administrative center of Nizovskoye Rural Settlement of Velsky District, Arkhangelsk Oblast, Russia. The population was 411 as of 2014. There are 13 streets.

Geography 
Terebino is located 27 km south of Velsk (the district's administrative centre) by road. Pershinskaya is the nearest rural locality.

References 

Rural localities in Velsky District